Wilhelmus Gerardus "Wilco" Zuijderwijk (born 2 October 1969 in Den Helder) is a Dutch track cyclist. He competed in the Men's points race and Men's team pursuit at the 2000 Summer Olympics, finishing 18th and 7th.

See also
 List of Dutch Olympic cyclists

References

1969 births
Dutch male cyclists
Olympic cyclists of the Netherlands
Cyclists at the 2000 Summer Olympics
People from Den Helder
Living people
Cyclists from North Holland
Dutch track cyclists
20th-century Dutch people
21st-century Dutch people